The Mount Kenya dwarf gecko (Lygodactylus wojnowskii) is a species of lizard in the family Gekkonidae. The species is endemic to Kenya.

Etymology
The specific name, wojnowskii, is in honor of American herpetologist David Wojnowski.

Habitat
The preferred habitat of L. wojnowskii is shrubs and trees, including fruit trees such as citrus, mango, and pawpaw.

Behavior
L. wojnowskii is arboreal, agile, and able to jump from branch to branch.

References

Further reading
Malonza PK, Granthon C, Williams DA (2016). "A new species of dwarf gecko in the genus Lygodactylus (Squamata: Gekkonidae) from Southeastern Kenya". Zootaxa 4061 (4): 308–320. (Lygodactylus wojnowskii, new species).
Spawls S, Howell K, Hinkel H, Menegon M (2018). Field Guide to East African Reptiles, Second Edition. London: Bloomsbury Natural History. 624 pp. .

Endemic fauna of Kenya
Lygodactylus
Reptiles described in 2016